The 1985 Arab Cup Final was a football match that took place on 12 July 1985, at the King Fahd Stadium in Ta'if, Saudi Arabia, to determine the winner of the 1985 Arab Cup. Iraq B defeated Bahrain 1–0 with two goals from Anad Abid to Iraq, to win their third Arab Cup. Iraq played with the B team in the tournament.

Road to the final

Match

Details

References

External links
1985 Arab Cup - rsssf.com

F
1985
Nations
Nations
International association football competitions hosted by Saudi Arabia
Iraq national football team matches
Bahrain national football team matches
July 1985 sports events in Asia